Ryan James (born 19 September 1999) is a United States rugby union player, currently playing for the LA Giltinis of Major League Rugby (MLR) and the United States national team. His preferred position is wing or fullback.

Professional career
James signed for Major League Rugby side LA Giltinis for the 2021 Major League Rugby season, having represented the now defunct Colorado Raptors during the 2020 season. 

James debuted for United States against New Zealand during the 2021 end-of-year rugby union internationals.

References

External links
itsrugby.co.uk Profile

1999 births
Living people
United States international rugby union players
American Raptors players
LA Giltinis players
Rugby union wings
Rugby union fullbacks
People from San Diego
American rugby union players